Metenino is a rural locality (a settlement) in Pekshinskoye Rural Settlement, Petushinsky District, Vladimir Oblast, Russia. The population was 221 as of 2010. There are 7 streets.

Geography 
Metenino is located 29 km east of Petushki (the district's administrative centre) by road. Naputnovo is the nearest rural locality.

References 

Rural localities in Petushinsky District